Carl Martin Rudolf Möhner (11 August 1921 – 14 January 2005) was an Austrian film actor, director, screenwriter and painter. He appeared in more than 40 films between 1949 and 1976. His most famous roles were as Jo "le Suédois" in the 1955 French heist film Rififi and as Captain of Battleship Bismarck in the film Sink the Bismarck!.

Möhner retired from filming in 1976. He married Wilma Langhamer, a German painter in 1978. In 1979 the couple settled down in McAllen, Texas, where Carl died from Parkinson's disease in 2005. He had two sons, Gunther and Gernot (also actors) from a previous relationship.

Selected filmography

 Vagabonds (1949) – (uncredited)
 Anna Louise and Anton (1953) – Höllriegel, Rennfahrer
 The Last Bridge (1954) – Martin Berger
 Rififi (1955) – Jo "le Suédois"
 The Vulture Wally (1956) – Bärenjosef
 Where the Ancient Forests Rustle (1956) – Klaus Baumgartner
 He Who Must Die (1957) – Lukas
  (1957) – Gerhard
 The Camp on Blood Island (1958) – Piet Van Elst
 The Key (1958) – Van Barger (scenes deleted)
 Passionate Summer (1958) – Louis
 Behind the Mask (1958) – Carl Romek
  (1959) – Peter Holm
 Sink the Bismarck! (1960) – Captain Lindermann
 The Challenge (1960) – Kristy
 The Kitchen (1961) – Peter
 Inshalla, Razzia am Bosporus (1962) – Inspektor Peter Hartwig
 The Fall of Rome (1963) – Marcus
 Cave of the Living Dead (1964) – The Village Doctor
  (1964) – Guitar
 L'uomo di Toledo (1965) – Don Ramiro
 Doc, Hands of Steel (1965) – Doc MacGregor
 30 Winchester per El Diablo (1965) – Jeff Benson
 The Murderer with the Silk Scarf (1966) – Boris Garrett
 Carmen, Baby (1967) – Medicio
 Hell Is Empty (1967) – Carl Schultz
 Assignment K (1968) – Inspector
 Death and Diamonds (1968) – Bloom
  (1968) – Mac
 The Last Mercenary (1968) – Steinmann
 Birdie (1971) – Birdie's Father
 Zu dumm zum... (1971)
 Der neue heiße Sex-Report (1971) – Hübner (uncredited)
 Eine Armee Gretchen (1973) – Felix Kuhn
  (1973) – Ivan Leskovich
 Callan (1974) – Schneider
 Užička republika (1974) – Oberst Helm
 Wanted: Babysitter (1975) – Cyrus Franklin
 Derrick (1975, Season 2, Episode 12: "Alarm auf Revier 12") – Oberinspektor Matthes
 Une femme à sa fenêtre (1976) – von Pahlen

References

External links

1921 births
2005 deaths
Neurological disease deaths in Texas
Deaths from Parkinson's disease
Austrian male film actors
20th-century Austrian male actors
Male actors from Vienna